Charles Deverson (2 November 1905 – 2 February 1945) was an Australian cricketer. He played three first-class matches for South Australia in 1930/31.

Charles Deverson lived in the Port Adelaide area all his life and played for Port Adelaide in the Adelaide cricket competition. He was a right-arm fast-medium bowler. Among his 10 wickets in Sheffield Shield cricket were those of Donald Bradman twice, for 61 and 121, in Deverson's second match, when he took 4 for 60 and 4 for 86. 

He died suddenly at the age of 39, leaving a widow, three daughters and a son.

See also
 List of South Australian representative cricketers

References

External links
 

1905 births
1945 deaths
Australian cricketers
South Australia cricketers
Cricketers from Adelaide